Cushman & Wakefield plc is a global commercial real estate services firm. The company's corporate headquarters is located in Chicago, Illinois.

Cushman & Wakefield is among the world's largest commercial real estate services firms, with revenues of US$10.1 billion in 2022. It is one of the "Big Three" commercial real estate services companies, alongside CBRE and JLL.

History
Cushman & Wakefield was founded in New York City on October 31, 1917, by brothers-in-law J. Clydesdale Cushman and Bernard Wakefield.

In the 1960s, Cushman & Wakefield began a national expansion, establishing offices throughout the U.S.

In 1969, RCA acquired Cushman & Wakefield, selling its stake to The Rockefeller Group in 1976.

In 1989, Mitsubishi Estate Co. Ltd. became the majority shareholder in The Rockefeller Group.

In 1990, a presence in Europe was established through the acquisition of Healey & Baker. George Healey founded the firm in 1910, taking building leases near Regent's Park during the construction of Regent Street.  He was joined by partner George Henry Baker, who joined the firm in 1910, and whose name was added to the firm's in 1920.  Baker initiated the firm's focus on commercial property.

In 1994, C&W worldwide partnership was established with real estate services firms in the U.S., Europe, Asia, South America, Mexico, and Canada.

In 2001, Cushman & Wakefield acquired Cushman Realty Corporation (CRC), increasing its presence on the West Coast and Southwest United States, bringing CRC founders John C. Cushman III and Louis B. Cushman back to the firm founded by their grandfather, J. Clydesdale Cushman and great-uncle, Bernard Wakefield. John C. Cushman became Chairman of the Board of Directors, and Louis B. Cushman, Vice Chairman.

In 2002, the Cushman & Wakefield Alliance Program was formed to expand service capabilities for clients in U.S. markets where owned offices were not maintained.

In 2007, IFIL (now known as EXOR), the investment group of the Agnelli family, acquired an approximately 70 percent stake in Cushman & Wakefield becoming the firm's majority shareholders and replacing the Rockefeller Group as majority shareholder of the firm. That same year, Cushman & Wakefield carried out a series of acquisitions which include real estate investment banking firm Sonnenblick Goldman, Semco, Alston Nock.

On February 24, 2015, it was confirmed that Exor SpA had approved management's hiring of Goldman Sachs Group Inc. and Morgan Stanley to help look for a buyer for Cushman.

On May 11, 2015, DTZ, a commercial-real-estate-services firm backed by private-equity giant TPG, PAG Asia Capital, and Ontario Teachers' Pension Plan (OTTP), agreed to buy Cushman & Wakefield Inc. for $2 billion.

On September 1, 2015, Cushman & Wakefield and DTZ merged. The firm now operates under the Cushman & Wakefield brand. The new Cushman & Wakefield is majority owned by an investor group led by TPG, PAG, and OTPP. The two companies combined for $6 billion in revenues and 45,000 employees. In 2016, the two engaged in more than $191 billion in commercial real estate transactions and approximately 4.3 billion square feet under management.

In October 2017, Chaney Brooks became an alliance partner with Cushman & Wakefield establishing a foothold in the Hawaii & Guam markets by partnering with one of the oldest commercial real estate firms in the islands.

In March 2018, Cushman & Wakefield had debts amounting to $3.1 billion, an increase of $300 million compared with the end of 2017. The company had a debt-annual revenue ratio of 44%, which was higher than that of its competitors CBRE Group, JLL and Zillow.

In June 2018, Cushman & Wakefield filed an S-1 form with the Securities & Exchange Commission announcing its intent to be listed on the NYSE. It became listed on the New York Stock Exchange on August 2, 2018.

On November 9, 2020, Cushman & Wakefield purchased significantly all of the holdings of Triad Commercial Properties. Tom Townes will be the managing director and Hap Royster will be the vice chairman of Cushman & Wakefield. On 13 November 2020, Cushman & Wakefield confirmed the hiring of Chris Cuff as Regional Executive Director of Commercial Leasing based in Singapore.

On July 6, 2022, it was held in contempt of court for failing to comply with subpoenas for documents pertaining to its longtime client, the Trump Organization.

See also
 CBRE Group
 Colliers International
 JLL (company)
 Newmark Group
 Marcus & Millichap

References

External links

Companies listed on the New York Stock Exchange
Property services companies of the United Kingdom
Real estate services companies of the United States
American companies established in 1917
Real estate companies established in 1917
Real estate companies of Canada
Companies based in Chicago
Companies based in the City of London
1917 establishments in New York City
2018 initial public offerings
Shopping center management firms